Energy performance certificates (EPCs) are a rating scheme to summarise the energy efficiency of buildings. 

In the European Union, EPCs are regulated by the European Directive on the energy performance of buildings.

Turkey
EPCs are mandatory when buying or selling property.

United Kingdom

United States

See also
Domestic energy assessor

References

Building energy rating